Motike may refer to:
 Motike (Banja Luka)
 Motike (Drvar)